Dover Green Historic District is a national historic district located at Dover, Kent County, Delaware.  It encompasses 79 contributing buildings centered on The Green and including most of the inhabited part of 18th century Dover.  Notable buildings include the Eagle Tavern (bef. 1791), Kent County Court House (1875), Baptist Church-Dover Century Club (1852), King Dougall House and Store House, Parke-Ridgely House (1728), and a number of 19th century Italianate-style commercial buildings.  Also located in the district are the separately listed Bradford-Loockerman House, Christ Church, and Old Statehouse.

It was added to the National Register of Historic Places in 1977. The Green also became part of First State National Historical Park on March 25, 2013, and is administered in cooperation with the National Park Service.

References

External links 

Buildings and structures in Dover, Delaware
Historic American Buildings Survey in Delaware
Georgian architecture in Delaware
Colonial Revival architecture in Delaware
Italianate architecture in Delaware
Historic districts in Kent County, Delaware
Tourist attractions in Dover, Delaware
Historic districts on the National Register of Historic Places in Delaware
National Register of Historic Places in Dover, Delaware
First State National Historical Park